The Huracanes Izcalli Fútbol Club is a Mexican football club based in Cuautitlán Izcalli. The club was founded in 2021, and currently plays in the Serie B of Liga Premier.

History
The team was founded in May 2021 and was entered into the Liga Premier – Serie B on July 30, 2021. On September 18 the team played its first official match, in this game it was defeated by Ciervos F.C. with a score of 1-0.

Stadium

The Estadio Hugo Sánchez Márquez is a multi-use stadium located in Cuautitlán Izcalli, State of Mexico, Mexico.  It is currently used mostly for football matches and is the home stadium for Huracanes Izcalli and Lobos Huerta of Liga Premier FMF Serie B and Club Leon of Liga TDP.  The stadium has a capacity of 3,500 people.

Players

Current squad

References

External links 

Association football clubs established in 2021
Football clubs in the State of Mexico
2021 establishments in Mexico
Liga Premier de México